The Little Egg Harbor Friends Meeting House is a historic Quaker meetinghouse located at 21 E. Main Street in the borough of Tuckerton in Ocean County, New Jersey, United States. The meetinghouse was built in 1863. It was documented by the Historic American Buildings Survey (HABS). The building was added to the National Register of Historic Places on December 9, 2002, for its significance in architecture and religion. Little Egg Harbor Meeting is part of Burlington Quarterly Meeting which is part of the Philadelphia Yearly Meeting. Friends continue to meet at Little Egg Harbor Meeting on Sundays at 10:30 a.m.

Little Egg Harbor Friends Meeting House shares its property with the Friends Burial Ground, which includes graves from the Parker, Pharo, and Ridgeway families.

See also
National Register of Historic Places listings in Ocean County, New Jersey

References

External links

Tuckerton, New Jersey
Quaker meeting houses in New Jersey
Churches on the National Register of Historic Places in New Jersey
Georgian architecture in New Jersey
Churches completed in 1863
Churches in Ocean County, New Jersey
National Register of Historic Places in Ocean County, New Jersey
New Jersey Register of Historic Places
Historic American Buildings Survey in New Jersey